KFDR (channel 25) is a religious television station licensed to Jefferson City, Missouri, United States, serving the Columbia–Jefferson City market as an owned-and-operated station of the Christian Television Network (CTN). The station's transmitter is located near New Bloomfield, Missouri.

History
The station (originally KNLJ) first signed an agreement on Easter Sunday in 1986 at 3 p.m. to be a sister station and simulcast to KNLC in St. Louis; at that time, both stations were owned by Reverend Larry Rice's ministry, the New Life Evangelistic Center.

In September 1986, KNLJ broke away from KNLC while it was still running most of the same Christian programs (such as The 700 Club, Richard Roberts, Jerry Falwell, among others) as well as locally produced programs from the ministry. They ran syndicated cartoons, some classic sitcoms, westerns, and outdoor sporting programs about 12 hours a day. In 1990, KNLJ affiliated with Fox Kids and also ran The Disney Afternoon. When Mid-Missouri got its own Fox affiliate a few years later, the Fox Kids block moved there. As the 1990s progressed, the secular shows were becoming much cheaper.

In mid-2007, the station was sold to the Christian Television Network with the New Life Evangelistic Center retaining KNLC. Both secular and Christian programming was dropped in favor of simulcasting the Christian Television Network full-time. Religious groups had previously bought time on both CTN and KNLJ.

On March 13, 2023, the station changed its call sign to KFDR.

Technical information

Subchannels
The station's digital signal is multiplexed:

Analog-to-digital conversion
KNLJ shut down its analog signal, over UHF channel 25, on June 12, 2009, the official date in which full-power television stations in the United States transitioned from analog to digital broadcasts under federal mandate. The station's digital signal remained on its pre-transition UHF channel 20. Through the use of PSIP, digital television receivers display the station's virtual channel as its former UHF analog channel 25.

References

External links
Official website

Christian Television Network affiliates
FDR
Television channels and stations established in 1986
1986 establishments in Missouri